Sotheby’s International Realty is a luxury real estate brand founded in 1976 by Sotheby's fine art dealers. Sotheby's International Realty operates as a franchise focusing on brokering and marketing of residential real estate.

As of 2018, the Sotheby's International Realty network had more than 19,000 sales associates in 990 offices in 72 countries and territories worldwide.

Franchise system
In February 2004, Sotheby’s entered into a long-term strategic alliance with real estate services provider Realogy Holdings Corp., now Anywhere Real Estate, Inc. The agreement provided for the licensing of the Sotheby’s International Realty name and the development of a full franchise system. Franchises in the system are granted to brokerages and individuals meeting Realogy's qualifications. The franchisor supports its agents with operational, marketing, recruiting, educational, and business development resources.
In 2012, the company launched a website for farm and ranch listings, the first in a series of specialty market Internet listings. Subsequently focused marketing websites include waterfront, golf, ski, and historic properties.

Sotheby's International Realty has offices worldwide with the most of them in USA, and Europe (Antwerp, Porto, Paris, Montenegro, Dublin...)

Reside magazine
The company publishes Reside, a semi-annual real estate and lifestyle magazine, which won the Hermes Platinum Award for creative excellence and outstanding design and editorial in 2009.

See also
Real estate
Real estate agent
Real estate broker

References

External links
 

Realogy brands
Apollo Global Management companies
Real estate companies established in 1976
Real estate services companies of the United States
Sotheby's